The Thessaloniki Transport Authority (ΟΣΕΘ), is an anonymous company which plans, coordinates, and oversees the urban transportation network of Thessaloniki, the second largest city in Greece. It is abbreviated as TheTA in English, a wordplay on the letter Theta which the first letter the word "Thessaloniki" in Greek. Its creation was necessitated in anticipation of the completion of the Thessaloniki Metro in 2023, which will see the city's bus network redeveloped, and the TheTA will take over the role of the Thessaloniki Urban Transport Organization once the metro is opened.

References

Transport in Thessaloniki
Organizations established in 2017